The 2016 Fiesta Bowl was a college football bowl game that was played on January 1, 2016 at University of Phoenix Stadium in Glendale, Arizona. The 44th Fiesta Bowl was one of the New Year's Bowls. It was one of the 2015–16 bowl games that concluded the 2015 FBS football season.

The game was televised on ESPN and ESPN Deportes, and broadcast on ESPN Radio and XM Satellite Radio, with the kickoff time set for 1:00 P.M. ET (11 A.M. MT). Sponsored by obstacle racing series BattleFrog, it was officially known as the BattleFrog Fiesta Bowl.

Coincidentally, it took place 10 years after the 2006 Fiesta Bowl, that was also played by Ohio State and Notre Dame. That was also the last time Notre Dame participated in the Fiesta Bowl.

Ohio State wound up beating Notre Dame, 44–28.

Teams
The participants for the game were determined by the College Football Playoff selection committee, and consisted of at-large selections and/or the highest ranked team from the "Group of Five" conferences. The two participants were the #8 Notre Dame Fighting Irish (10–2) vs. the #7 Ohio State Buckeyes (11–1).

Game summary

Scoring summary

Source:

Statistics

References

2015–16 NCAA football bowl games
2016,01
2016 Fiesta Bowl
2016 Fiesta Bowl
January 2016 sports events in the United States
2016 in sports in Arizona